Tolstoy Park (also known as the Henry Stuart House and the Hermit House) is a historic residence in Montrose, Alabama.  The house was built by Henry Stuart, an Englishman who had emigrated to the United States as a child.  Stuart was living in Nampa, Idaho, when he was diagnosed with tuberculosis and advised to move to a warmer climate to live out his days.  In 1923, he purchased 10 acres (4 ha) outside Fairhope, Alabama, which he named Tolstoy Park.

Stuart began building a circular, domed hut in 1925, pouring each concrete block himself.  Construction was completed in less than a year, although delayed by a hurricane in September 1926.  The house is about 14 feet (4.2 m) in diameter and sunk 2 feet (61 cm) into the ground.  Six top-hinged windows circle the building, and there were two skylights in the roof that are now permanently closed.  Stuart sought to live a simple life, growing much of his own food and weaving rugs on a loom he brought from Idaho.  He kept a guestbook for visitors to sign; notably, lawyer Clarence Darrow visited the hut six times.  Stuart left Alabama in 1944, moving to Oregon to live with his son, where he died in 1946.

Today, the hut and a large oak tree are all that remain of Stuart's estate; a parking lot for a real estate office surrounds the hut.  A novel based on Stuart's life, The Poet of Tolstoy Park, was published in 2005.  The house was listed on the National Register of Historic Places in 2006.

References

Houses completed in 1926
Houses in Baldwin County, Alabama
National Register of Historic Places in Baldwin County, Alabama
1926 establishments in Alabama